Yasu College of Education  is a teachers college in  Petauke town, Eastern Zambia.  It offers  offer secondary teacher's diploma courses. 

Yasu College was registered by Reverend Leslie Herbert Zulu on 18 November 2015 .  It opened on 11 January 2016.

External links
Yasu College of Education on Facebook

Educational institutions established in 2015
2015 establishments in Zambia
Universities and colleges in Zambia